Human Rites is a Belgian play by Amélie Nothomb. It was first published in 1994. It is set in an eastern city under siege. The play has been adapted for stage and performed as an opera.

Characters
The play has only three characters:

Daniel: an idealist and dreamer, assistant professor. 
Marina: "soul mate" of Daniel, Marina completed her university studies. . Very eccentric, lucid, she believes to have "fallen into hell" 
Professor: impudent, insolent

References

Belgian plays
1994 plays